Allan Casey is a Canadian writer, whose book Lakeland: Journeys into the Soul of Canada, won the Governor General's Award for English non-fiction in 2010. The book was also a shortlisted nominee for the Edna Staebler Award.

Born in Regina, Saskatchewan, and raised in Prince Albert, Casey has written for a variety of publications, including Adbusters, Canadian Business, Canadian Geographic, Canadian Living, Reader's Digest and Books in Canada.

References

External links
Allan Casey

Canadian travel writers
Canadian nature writers
Journalists from Saskatchewan
Writers from Prince Albert, Saskatchewan
Writers from Regina, Saskatchewan
Living people
Year of birth missing (living people)
Governor General's Award-winning non-fiction writers
21st-century Canadian non-fiction writers
21st-century Canadian male writers
Canadian male non-fiction writers